Tanner is an unincorporated community in Gilmer County, West Virginia, United States.

The community was named after an early settler named Tanner.

References

Unincorporated communities in Gilmer County, West Virginia
Unincorporated communities in West Virginia